Márcio Henrique Silva Paiva (born 31 July 1980 in Folgosa, Maia, Porto District) is a Portuguese former professional footballer who played as a goalkeeper.

References

External links

1980 births
Living people
People from Maia, Portugal
Sportspeople from Porto District
Portuguese footballers
Association football goalkeepers
Primeira Liga players
Liga Portugal 2 players
Segunda Divisão players
F.C. Maia players
Vitória S.C. players
C.D. Feirense players
Rio Ave F.C. players
F.C. Famalicão players
U.D. Leiria players
U.D. Oliveirense players
S.C. Farense players
F.C. Felgueiras 1932 players
Cypriot First Division players
Doxa Katokopias FC players
Portuguese expatriate footballers
Expatriate footballers in Cyprus
Portuguese expatriate sportspeople in Cyprus